"Jealousy" is a song by French DJ and record producer Martin Solveig. The song was released in the France as a CD single on 8 May 2006. It was released as the second single from his second studio album Hedonist (2005). The song was written and produced by Martin Solveig. The song peaked at number 36 on the French Singles Chart, and at number 62 on the UK Singles Chart.

Track listing

Chart performance

Release history

References

2006 songs
Martin Solveig songs
Songs written by Martin Solveig